The Matt and Jo Show was a breakfast radio show broadcast on Fox FM in Melbourne, Australia. Matt Tilley and Jo Stanley were hosts, along with Troy Ellis as anchor and Adam Richard as gossip reporter. It was broadcast live 6-9am weekday mornings from Austereo's South Melbourne studios, and replayed on Saturday mornings from 6-8am.

History
The show was founded late in 2003 after Tracy Bartram left Fox FM. Jo Stanley, who had been working at Fox FM on the show Jodie and Jo, then moved to Triple M to host The Shebang. Once Tracy Bartram officially left Fox FM, Jo joined the breakfast show, initially named Matt, Jo and Benno with the Fabulous Adam Richard.

Chris Bennett left a couple of months into the year and it was renamed The Matt & Jo Show with the Fabulous Adam Richard. Soon after, the show introduced anchor Troy Ellis and it was renamed to simply The Matt and Jo Show. The show was known for holding the highest ratings for over a number of years. News updates were presented by Krystal Keller.

In 2009, whilst Stanley was away on maternity leave, her position was filled by Michala Banas (McLeod's Daughters and Neighbours). Comedian Dave Thornton was a regular fill in presenter for Matt Tilley.

The Matt and Jo Show was the number 1 breakfast show in Melbourne, with more listeners than any other breakfast show. It has led the FM share in Melbourne for more than 40 surveys (five years).

It was announced on 4 October 2013 that the show would finish at the end of the year. The final show aired on Friday 29 November 2013 on the Fox FM rooftop.

In November 2013, Fifi Box and Dave Thornton were announced as the new Fox FM breakfast team, Fifi & Dave.

In October 2020, Fox FM celebrated 40 years and Matt Tilley, Jo Stanley, Troy Ellis and Adam Richard reunited after seven years for a special one hour show.

Segments
Matt Tilley's Gotcha Calls 
Gotcha Calls are a series of prank calls done by Matt Tilley. Each week Matt receives emails from listeners of the show who set up a friend or a colleague for a Gotcha Call. Gotcha  calls involve Matt Tilley projecting a strange voice and cornering the victim in a tough situation in the call, often involving embarrassing or angering a person. The calls are then broadcast on air on 7.50 a.m., weekdays. This segment has produced three Gold selling CDs and made over $500,000 for Melbourne charities. Released through Michael Gudinski's Liberation record label, 'The Double Album' released in 2006, and 'Three's A Crowd' released in 2007, were both nominated for ARIA Awards.

Scoopla with The Fabulous Adam Richard
Scoopla with The Fabulous Adam Richard was a segment where Adam Richard presents his updated daily gossip and news about celebrities. This segment happened daily at 7.30am and 8.30am after the news.

Fox To The Rescue
Fox To The Rescue was a segment that receives thousands of emails a year from the people of Melbourne wanting to do something kind for people in need. They are sometimes emails of tragedy or need and also emails of people wanting to say thanks to a friend or family member. The team then ring up these people and talk to them about their problems and help them by giving them something, such as a gift-voucher or money.

Jobe's Footy Tips
Jobe's Footy Tips was a segment where the breakfast team was joined by the Essendon Football Club's, Jobe Watson who chats about the latest football controversies and also gives his footy tipping for the week live on-air. The segment aired on Friday mornings.

External links
Official website

References

Matt and Jo Show
2000s Australian radio programs
2010s Australian radio programs